Friedrich von Greuhm (1780 – December 1, 1823 Washington, D.C.) was a German diplomat, and was Minister Resident and Consul-General to the United States, for King Frederick William III of Prussia from 1817 to 1823.

He served in London, and Spain.
He is interred in Congressional Cemetery.

References

1780 births
1823 deaths
Ambassadors of Germany to the United States